Gordonia is a genus of flowering plants in the family Theaceae, related to Franklinia, Camellia and Stewartia. Of the roughly 40 species, all but two are native to southeast Asia in southern China, Taiwan and Indochina. The remaining species, G. lasianthus (Loblolly-bay), is native to southeast North America, from Virginia south to Florida and west to Louisiana; G. fruticosa is native to the tropical rainforests of Central and South America, from Costa Rica to Brazil.

They are evergreen trees, growing to 10–20 m tall. The bark is thick and deeply fissured. The leaves are alternately arranged, simple, serrated, thick, leathery, glossy, and 6–18 cm long. The flowers are large and conspicuous, 4–15 cm diameter, with 5 (occasionally 6-8) white petals; flowering is in late winter or early spring. The fruit is a dry five-valved capsule, with 1-4 seeds in each section.

The species are adapted to acidic soils, and do not grow well on chalk or other calcium-rich soils. They also have a high rainfall requirement and will not tolerate drought.

Some botanists include Franklinia within Gordonia, even though recent phylogenetic studies show that Franklinia'''s closest living relationship is with the Asian genera Schima and not Gordonia; it differs in being deciduous and flowering in late summer, not late winter. The draft Flora of China account of Theaceae in China splits Gordonia into two genera, with G. lasianthus retained in Gordonia, and the Asian species transferred to Polyspora; this treatment is not yet widely accepted.Gordonia chrysandra may have anti-inflammatory medicinal properties.

Species
There are about 40 species, including:Gordonia anomalaGordonia balansaeGordonia ceylanicaGordonia curtyanaGordonia fruticosaGordonia hirtaGordonia hirtellaGordonia javanicaGordonia lasianthusGordonia maingayiGordonia multinervisGordonia penangensisGordonia scortechiniiGordonia shimidaeGordonia sinensisGordonia singaporeanaGordonia speciosaGordonia tagawaeGordonia taipingensisGordonia villosaGordonia wallichiiGordonia yunnanensisGordonia species from East Asia were transferred to Polyspora, including:Polyspora acuminataPolyspora axillarisPolyspora chrysandraPolyspora hainanensisPolyspora kwangsiensisPolyspora longicarpaPolyspora tiantangensisPolyspora tonkinensisCultivation and uses
Several species of Gordonia'' are grown as ornamental plants for their flowers produced in winter when few other trees are in flower. They are however difficult to grow compared to the similar but generally smaller-growing camellias.

References

External links
Flora of China: draft text of Theaceae

 
Ericales genera